Ekinciler can refer to:

 Ekinciler, Göynük
 Ekinciler, Yenişehir